Hiraasat is a 1987 Indian Hindi-language action film directed by Surendra Mohan, starring Shatrughan Sinha, Mithun Chakraborty, Hema Malini and Anita Raj in lead roles.

Plot 
Assistant Commissioner of Police Ashok Saxena (Shatrughan Sinha) lives a middle-classed lifestyle along with his wife, Shobha (Hema Malini), a former street dancer and a younger college-going brother, Rajesh (Mithun Chakraborty). His father was also a police officer and he wanted Rajesh to become a police officer. He is honest to a fault but ends up getting arrested for drug-trafficking and suspects that Rajesh has taken to a life of crime in order to satisfy the wealthy father of his sweetheart Renu (Anita Raj).

Cast

Shatrughan Sinha as ACP Ashok Saxena
Hema Malini as Shobha Saxena
Mithun Chakraborty as Rajesh Saxena "Raju"
Anita Raj as Renu 
Prem Chopra as Dhanraj 'Pat' Patwardhan
Shakti Kapoor as Sippy
Dalip Tahil as Shyam (Dhanraj's Brother-in-law)
Sujit Kumar as Renu's Father
Chandrashekhar as R.K. Tandon, Police Commissioner
Kalpana Iyer as Dancer / Singer
Bob Christo as Bob
Poonam Dasgupta as Sushma
Chandrakant Gokhale as Narayan Rao
Kamal Kapoor as Tom
Jayshree T. as item number
Huma Khan as Mrs. Patwardhan
Amrit Pal as Rajesh's boss
Meenal Patel as Renu's mom
Nilu Phule	as Dhirubhai
Vandana Rane		
Gurbachchan Singh

Songs
Lyrics: Vishweshwar Sharma

References

External links
 

1987 films
1980s Hindi-language films
Indian action films
Films scored by Kalyanji Anandji
1987 action films
Films directed by Surendra Mohan